Princess Antoinette of Saxe-Altenburg (17 April 1838 –  13 October 1908) was a princess of Saxe-Altenburg by birth and Duchess of Anhalt by marriage.

Biography
Antoinette was the second child of Prince Eduard of Saxe-Altenburg (1804-1852) from his first marriage with Amalie (1815-1841), daughter of Karl, Prince of Hohenzollern-Sigmaringen.

She married on 22 April 1854 in Altenburg the future Friedrich I, Duke of Anhalt (1831-1904). The marriage was for dynastic reasons and Antoinette married one of the richest German princes. On the occasion of the marriage was coined a commemorative medal.

Issue
Antoinette and Friedrich had six children:

Leopold, Hereditary Prince of Anhalt (1855–1886), married Princess Elisabeth of Hesse-Kassel in 1884.
Friedrich II, Duke of Anhalt (1856–1918), married Princess Marie of Baden in 1889.
Princess Elisabeth of Anhalt (1857–1933), married Adolf Friedrich V, Grand Duke of Mecklenburg in Strelitz in 1877.
Eduard, Duke of Anhalt (1861–1918), married Princess Luise of Saxe-Altenburg in 1895.
Prince Aribert of Anhalt (1866–1933), married Princess Marie Louise of Schleswig-Holstein in 1891.
Princess Alexandra of Anhalt (1868–1958), married Sizzo, Prince of Schwarzburg in 1897.

Ancestry

References

House of Saxe-Altenburg
House of Ascania
Duchesses of Anhalt
1838 births
1908 deaths
Princesses of Saxe-Altenburg
German people of French descent
Royal reburials